Activator of 90 kDa heat shock protein ATPase homolog 1 is an enzyme that in humans is encoded by the AHSA1 gene.

Interactions 

AHSA1 has been shown to interact with Heat shock protein 90kDa alpha (cytosolic), member A1.

References

External links

Further reading 

 
 
 
 
 
 
 
 

Co-chaperones